Câmpulung (also spelled Cîmpulung, Old Romanian Dlăgopole, Длъгополе (from Middle Bulgarian)), or Câmpulung Muscel, is a municipality in the Argeș County, Muntenia, Romania. It is situated among the outlying hills of the Carpathian mountains, at the head of a long well-wooded glen traversed by the Râul Târgului, a tributary of the Argeș.

Its pure air and fine scenery render Câmpulung a popular summer resort. In the city there are more than twenty churches, besides a monastery and a cathedral, which both claim to have been founded in the 13th century by Radu Negru, legendary first Prince of Wallachia.

Name 
"Câmpulung" literally means "Long Field" in Romanian, rendered as "Longus-Campus" in Latin.

History 

Near Câmpulung are the remains of a Roman camp now known as the Castra of Jidava (or Jidova); and just beyond the gates, vestiges of a Roman colony, variously identified with Romula, Stepenium and Ulpia Traiana, but now called Grădiștea (meaning place of a fortress in Romanian) or Jidovi.

Câmpulung was one of the earliest urban settlements in Wallachia, the Transylvanian Saxon colonists contributing to its development by bringing the German urban culture. The earliest written evidence of the town's existence is dated 1300, and is to be found in the Câmpulung church. The inscription is an epitaph of Laurencius de Longo Campo, the full text being Hic sepultus est comes Laurencius de Longo-Campo, pie memorie, Anno Domini MCCC ("Here is buried count Laurentius of Longus-Campus, in pious memory, Anno Domini 1300"). Laurentius was most likely the person coordinating the colonization process.

The first written record of Old Romanian language dated back to 1521 (Neacșu's letter) names the city by its Old Romanian name, which was Slavic, according to its roots: Dlăgopole — Длъгополь (with the same meaning — "a long field").

The elongated shape of the town was determined by the valley and it had two main parallel streets. The town had a central market square, located near Prince's Church of Saint Nicholas and an annual fair which was held in the west of the town, near St. Elijah's Church. The non-German areas of the town were found towards the outskirts of the medieval town, where two Orthodox churches were built during the 14th-15th centuries.

Originally, the Romanians of the town did not have the same rights as the German colonists, but by the 15th century, the two communities were already merged, as shown by the new Romanian churches built near the Catholic areas and by the fact that some of the elected județs were Romanians. Another community in the town were the Bogomil Bulgarians, who settled in the Șchei neighbourhood (Șchei being an old Romanian word referring to Slavic people). Outside the town, in the south-west, on the hill currently named Câmpul mișeilor ("Field of the cripple") was a leper colony, which had its own church and mill.

Câmpulung was the first capital of the feudal state of Wallachia, until succeeded by Curtea de Argeș in the 14th century. There was a considerable traffic with Transylvania, over the Bran Pass, 15 miles to the north, and with the south by a branch railway to Ploiești.

Census

See also 
 The letter of Neacșu of Câmpulung

Natives 
Theodor Aman
Constantin D. Aricescu
Gheorghe Arsenescu
Ion Barbu
George Demetrescu Mirea
Dora Gad
Nicolae Golescu
Ștefan Golescu
Radu Gyr
Ion Jinga
Petre Libardi
Gabriel Moiceanu
Tudor Mușatescu
D. Nanu
Ion Negulici
George Oprescu
Constantin Ion Parhon
Pârvu Mutu
Mihail Vlădescu

Notes

References

External links 

 Câmpulung City Hall Official Site 

 
Populated places in Argeș County
Localities in Muntenia
Cities in Romania
Former capitals of Romania
Market towns in Wallachia
Monotowns in Romania
Capitals of former Romanian counties